Love Is the Law is the second studio album by English singer-songwriter Charlene Soraia. It was released on 11 September 2015 by Peacefrog Records. The album features the singles "Ghost", "Broken", "Caged", and "I'll Be There".

Singles
 "Ghost" was released as the album's lead single on 18 March 2013. This song was co-written by the performer's ex-boyfriend, Jon Allen.
 "Broken" was released as the album's second single on 4 August 2013. This song was co-written by Ricky Ross and Francis White.
 "Caged" was released as the album's third single on 21 July 2014. This song was co-written by Jim Eliot.
 "I'll Be There" was released as the album's fourth single on 9 March 2015.

Track listing

References

External links
 Official website
 Charlene Soraia on Facebook
 Charlene Soraia on Twitter
 Charlene Soraia's YouTube Channel
 Charlene Soraia's VEVO YouTube Channel

2015 albums
Charlene Soraia albums
Peacefrog Records albums